"Can't Get It Out of My Head" is a song written by Jeff Lynne and originally recorded by Electric Light Orchestra (also known as ELO).

First released on the band's fourth album Eldorado in September 1974, the song is the second track on the album and follows "Eldorado Overture". The song was released in November the same year as a single.

The song became the band's first top 10 single in the United States, reaching number 9, and helped boost public awareness of the band in the U.S.; however, back in the UK the single and LP failed to chart. In 1978, it was included as the lead song on the four-track The ELO EP (UK release), reaching number 34 on the UK charts. The song has appeared on many ELO compilation albums.

Critical reception 
Record World said that Jeff Lynne and company brew up a brilliant batch of hook melody strains from the last decade of ballads into one fresh triumph."

AllMusic's Mike DeGagne said the song would become "one of Electric Light Orchestra's most beautiful ballads" thanks to "the rich backdrop of strings (especially cello) and the steady, delicate cymbal taps that enhance the song's charm", adding: "there's an honest simplicity built around the dynamics of the relaxed rhythm and it's this enchanting air, mixed with the storybook lyrics and poetic wonderment of the song that carries the listener away, even if they're indecipherable at times", considering the song as "the band's best example of this recipe implemented toward a slower style".

Personnel 
Credits adapted from "Can't Get It Out of My Head" liner notes.

Electric Light Orchestra

 Jeff Lynne – lead vocals, guitar, Moog synthesizer, arrangements
 Richard Tandy – piano, Moog synthesizer, arrangements
 Michael De Albuquerque – bass
 Bev Bevan – drums, percussion
 Michael Edwards – cello
 Mik Kaminski – violin
 Hugh McDowell – cello

Additional musicians

 Louis Clark – orchestra conducting, arrangements

Production

 Jeff Lynne – production
 Dick Plant – engineering
 Mike Pela – engineering
 Kenny Denton – engineering assistance
 John Richards – engineering assistance

Recording

 Recorded at De Lane Lea Studios, London.

Chart performance

Weekly charts

Year-end charts

Jeff Lynne versions

Jeff Lynne re-recorded the song in his own home studio. It was released in a compilation album with other re-recorded ELO songs under the ELO name.

In 2012, as part of the concert from his home studio, Live From Bungalow Palace, Lynne performed an acoustic version of the song with longtime ELO pianist Richard Tandy.

References

External links
 In-depth Song Analysis at the Jeff Lynne Song Database (jefflynnesongs.com)
 List of "Can't Get It Out of My Head" cover versions with YouTube & Spotify links at SecondHandSongs.com

1974 songs
1974 singles
Electric Light Orchestra songs
Song recordings produced by Jeff Lynne
Songs written by Jeff Lynne
Velvet Revolver songs
British soft rock songs
United Artists Records singles
Warner Records singles